The 1984–85 Memphis State Tigers men's basketball team represented Memphis State University as a member of the Metro Conference during the 1984–85 NCAA Division I men's basketball season.

After losing in the Sweet 16 each of the previous three seasons, the Tigers broke through to reach the Final Four of the 1985 NCAA tournament and finished with a 31–4 record (13–1 Metro).

Roster

Schedule and results

|-
!colspan=9 style= | Regular season
|-

|-
!colspan=9 style= | Metro Conference tournament
|-

|-
!colspan=9 style= | NCAA Tournament
|-

Rankings

Awards and honors
Keith Lee – Metro Conference Player of the Year, Consensus First-team All-American

References

Memphis Tigers men's basketball seasons
1984 in sports in Tennessee
1985 in sports in Tennessee
Memphis State
NCAA Division I men's basketball tournament Final Four seasons
Memphis State